Charles Cummings may refer to:

Charles Amos Cummings (1833–1905), American architect and architectural historian
Charles A. Cummings a/k/a Charles A. Comings, American politician, mayor of Flint, Michigan in 1900–01
Charles Cummings (actor) (c. 1870–1918), American silent film performer
Charles Clarence Robert Orville Cummings (1910–1990), American actor, stage name Robert Cummings or Bob Cummings

See also
Charles Cumming (born 1971), Scottish writer of spy fiction